Ralph Gordon Davis (May 30, 1922 – September 26, 1992) was an American football guard who played professionally in the National Football League (NFL) with the Green Bay Packers.

References

1922 births
1992 deaths
American football guards
Green Bay Packers players
Wisconsin Badgers football players
People from Seymour, Wisconsin
Players of American football from Wisconsin